Milltown is an unincorporated community in New Castle County, Delaware, United States. Milltown is located at the intersection of Delaware Route 7 and Milltown Road west of Wilmington.

References

External links

Unincorporated communities in New Castle County, Delaware
Unincorporated communities in Delaware